= Unification of Japan =

Unification of Japan may refer to:

- Kofun period (250–538), when the nations and tribes of Japan gradually coalesced into a centralized empire
- Azuchi–Momoyama period, which resulted in Japan being unified under the Tokugawa shogunate
